Beijing No.166 High School (pinyin: Běijīng shì yiliuliu zhōngxué) is an elite public beacon high school near the Forbidden City, in the historical ward of Dongcheng District, Beijing, China. It was founded in 1864 by the American pioneer Eliza Jane Gillett Bridgman as Bridgman Girls' College, later  Peking Bridgman Girls' High School as a Christian academy offering female education, making it the oldest girls' school and the earliest western style academy in Beijing, and was credited with educating a large number of female Chinese leaders before the foundation of "Red China".
Although the Bridgman Girls' High School became the public, co-education Beijing No.166 High School after the Communist government took over, nowadays, it still holds a special relationship with Mount Holyoke College, a member of American Seven Sisters, due to its historical traditions, and periodically dispatches students to visit the Cold Spring Harbour Laboratory. The school is proud that all of its liberal arts and most of its science students could pass the enrolment line of key universities (Tier 1 schools) in National Higher Education Entrance Examination, which is considered as a proof of elite school in China.

History

Qing dynasty Period

The famous American pioneer educational missionary in China, Eliza Jane Gillett Bridgman (1805–1871) opened up Bridgman Girls' College after  obtaining substantial land in 1864, following the British and French victory of the Second Opium War. The college had changed her name to Peking Bridgman Girls' High School since 1895. During the Boxer Rebellion, one third of students were killed, and others were protected by British embassy until the Eight-Nation Alliance controlled Peking. Later, the school was developed into a series of Christian academies: the Bridgman Boys' High School (now Beijing No.25 High School), the Bridgman Elementary School (now Dengshikou Primary school), and in 1905, the Women's College of Yenching University was established based on the school, which was spited up by the Communist government, and merged into Tsinghua University, Renmin University of China, Peking University whilst the campus is still occupied by Peking University today.

Republic of China Period

After the Republic of China founded, the school purchased the Tung-Fu campus, which had been Grand Secretary of the Jiajing Emperor Yan Song's palace in Ming dynasty, as well as belonged to the Kangxi Emperor's mother, Empress Xiaokangzhang's family in Qing dynasty. During the era of ROC, the influence and history of Bridgman Girls' High School led to it being one of the most prestigious schools in Beijing, huge amount of female from Chinese upper class had attended the school.

People's republic of China Period

The school remained as an independent school until 1951, when the Communist Government took over all western background academy after China intervened in the Korean War. At the beginning, it was renamed as Beijing No.12 Girls' High School, and was one of ten "Municipal Model High Schools" accredited by the Beijing Municipal Government. While the Cultural Revolution made serious impact to the school due to its history of Christian academy that educating females from upper class, who were the main social group would be purged in the revolution. For example, the female drama director Sun Weishi aroused enmity and was killed by Mao's wife, and a leader of the revolution Jiang Qing, was graduated from Bridgman Girls' High School. Finally, after an age of chaos, the school became into Beijing No.166 High School in 1971.

Notable people 

Li Dequan (Chinese: 李德全; 1896–1972), the first Minister of Health of the People's Republic of China.
Xie Wanying (Chinese: 謝婉瑩; 1900–1999), better known by her pen name Bing Xin or Xie Bingxin, was one of the most prolific Chinese writers of the 20th Century.
Wang Xiuying (Chinese: 王秀瑛; 1908–2000, the first Chinese recipient of the Florence Nightingale Medal.
C.S. Wang Chang (Chinese: 王承书;1912–1994), was a nuclear physicist and an academician of the Chinese Academy of Sciences.
Xie Xide (Chinese: 謝希德; 1921–2000), also known as Hsi-teh Hsieh and as Hilda Hsieh, was a Chinese physicist and former president of Fudan University as well as the first female university president in China. 
Jiang Lijin (Chinese: 蒋丽金; 1919–2008), was a chemist and an academician of the Chinese Academy of Sciences.

See also
Beacon high schools in Beijing

References

External links
 

High schools in Beijing
Schools in Dongcheng District, Beijing